Anarmostus is a monotypic genus of flies belonging to the family Asilidae. The only species is Anarmostus iopterus.

The species is found in Central and Southern America.

References

Asilidae
Monotypic Diptera genera